Washington Augusto Poyet Carreras(12 January 1939 – 16 June 2007) was a Uruguayan basketball player who competed in the 1960 Summer Olympics and in the 1964 Summer Olympics. He was the father of footballer Gus Poyet, and the grandfather of Diego Poyet.

References

External links
 

1939 births
2007 deaths
Uruguayan men's basketball players
1959 FIBA World Championship players
Olympic basketball players of Uruguay
Basketball players at the 1960 Summer Olympics
Basketball players at the 1963 Pan American Games
Basketball players at the 1964 Summer Olympics
Pan American Games competitors for Uruguay
1967 FIBA World Championship players